Charles Ladd "Ren" Thomas (1895 – August 1955) was an American football and basketball coach and professor. He served as the head football coach at Nebraska Wesleyan University from 1925 to 1926, compiling a record of 12–4–2. Dow was also the head basketball coach at Nebraska Wesleyan from 1924 to 1930, tallying a mark of 40–55.

A native of Cattaraugus, New York, Dow taught at Clarion State Teachers College—now known as Clarion University of Pennsylvania—before becoming chair of the department of geology and geography at Ohio University. While coaching at Nebraska Wesleyan, he earned a PhD at the University of Nebraska–Lincoln. He died in August 1955 of a heart attack while returning from Japan aboard a Japanese ship.

Head coaching record

College football

References

External links
 

1895 births
1955 deaths
Basketball coaches from New York (state)
Nebraska Wesleyan Prairie Wolves athletic directors
Nebraska Wesleyan Prairie Wolves football coaches
Nebraska Wesleyan Prairie Wolves men's basketball coaches
High school basketball coaches in Nebraska
High school football coaches in Nebraska
Clarion University of Pennsylvania faculty
Ohio University faculty
University of Nebraska–Lincoln alumni
People from Cattaraugus County, New York